Cheyenne Nicole Woods (born July 25, 1990) is an American professional golfer.

Early life
Woods was born in Phoenix, Arizona. She is a daughter of Susan Woods and Earl Dennison Woods Jr., who is golfer Tiger Woods' half-brother, making Cheyenne Tiger's half-niece. Her paternal grandfather Earl Woods (Tiger's father) was her first coach and inspiration.

In an interview with Golf Digest, Woods stated that her mother was white and her father African American with some Native American and Asian.

Career
Woods played for the Xavier College Preparatory golf team and won back-to-back Arizona 5A State Championships in 2006 and 2007. She graduated from Wake Forest University in 2012 where she played golf for the Demon Deacons. She has won more than 30 amateur tournaments.

In 2009, she received a sponsor's exemption to play in an LPGA tournament, the Wegmans LPGA. She missed the cut by four strokes.

In April 2011, she won the Atlantic Coast Conference (ACC) championship.

In 2012, Woods turned professional after graduating from Wake Forest. She qualified for the 2012 U.S. Women's Open by finishing as co-medalist at her qualifier and made her professional debut at the 2012 LPGA Championship.  She had her first professional win on the SunCoast Ladies Series in late August 2012.

In 2013, Woods became a member of the Ladies European Tour and finished 78th on the Order of Merit. In 2014, Woods had her second professional win (and first on a major tour) at the Volvik RACV Ladies Masters.

In December 2014, Woods finished T-11th in the LPGA Final Qualifying Tournament, thereby earning Category 12 membership, which entitled her to entry in most full-field events apart from the more prestigious events. In the 2015 season, she made only eight cuts and had to go through qualifying again. By finishing T-13th in the Final Qualifying Tournament, she earned her LPGA tour card for 2016.

Woods is the sixth African American to play on the LPGA Tour. In an interview Woods said "An African American woman has never won on the LPGA, so in general I just feel that golf needs to be more accessible and more inclusive."

Professional wins (2)

Ladies European Tour wins (1)

* Co-sanctioned with ALPG Tour

Other wins (1)
2012 SunCoast Ladies Series LPGA International

Results in LPGA majors
Results not in chronological order before 2018.

^ The Evian Championship was added as a major in 2013.

CUT = missed the half-way cut
NT = no tournament
T = tied

References

External links

Photos of Cheyenne Woods playing golf

American female golfers
African-American golfers
Wake Forest Demon Deacons women's golfers
Ladies European Tour golfers
LPGA Tour golfers
Golfers from Phoenix, Arizona
Native American sportspeople
American people who self-identify as being of Native American descent
1990 births
Living people
21st-century African-American women
21st-century African-American sportspeople